The wakin is an intermediate twin tailed goldfish variety that has been originated from Japan. It is believed the wakin gave rise to fancy twin-tailed goldfish, including the ryukin, ranchu, oranda, fantail pearlscale, and many more twin-tailed goldfish. It is also the second oldest variety, developed from the common goldfish.

In Japan
The wakin has many popular cultures and beliefs in the history of Japanese goldfish. The wakin goldfish, in Japanese terms, are any 'Huna' bodied goldfish with a single tail (in reference to the popular common goldfish), double tail, or triple tail, while in US, a wakin is simply a double tail goldfish with a long body. They are also seen in red and white, which are prized for competition. Other colors have been made from it, such as chocolate, blue, red, white, orange, and yellow. There is also a calico wakin, but for some reason, the regards to its color process, the calico wakin is not a full-blooded wakin line.

Breeding
Despite the fish's double tail, breeding is easy as long as young fish are cared for properly.

Other types
The watonai goldfish is a cross between the wakin and the ryukin.

Ise Nishiki is a goldfish thought to be cross between Sakura wakin and Sakura ryukin

See also
 List of goldfish varieties

References

Goldfish breeds